
The Electoral district of Counties of Cook and Westmoreland, also known as the United Midland Counties of Cook and Westmoreland, was an electorate of the New South Wales Legislative Council at a time when some of its members were elected and the balance were appointed by the Governor.

It was created by the Electoral Act 1843 and returned one member. named after Cook and Westmoreland counties two of the original Nineteen Counties in New South Wales, covering the Blue Mountains, Lithgow and Oberon areas, including the towns of Hartley, Penrith and Wilberforce. Polling also took place at nearby towns such as Bathurst and North Richmond, however they were not in the district.

In 1856 the unicameral Legislative Council was abolished and replaced with an elected Legislative Assembly and an appointed Legislative Council. The district was represented by the two member Legislative Assembly electorate of Cook and Westmoreland and James Martin, was re-elected along with Robert Jamison.

Members

Election results

There were three elections held in the district.

1843

1848

1851

See also
Members of the New South Wales Legislative Council, 1843–1851 and 1851-1856

External links

References

Former electoral districts of New South Wales Legislative Council
1843 establishments in Australia
1856 disestablishments in Australia